Ochyrotica africana is a moth of the family Pterophoridae. It is known from the Democratic Republic of Congo.

References

Ochyroticinae
Insects of the Democratic Republic of the Congo
Moths of Africa
Endemic fauna of the Democratic Republic of the Congo
Moths described in 1969